The North Cedar Community School District is a rural public school district headquartered in Stanwood, Iowa. The district is in portions of northern Cedar County and a small section of Jones County, and serves the communities of Stanwood, Mechanicsville, Clarence and Lowden, and  surrounding unincorporated areas.

North Cedar consists of three schools: elementary schools (preK-6) in Lowden and Mechanicsville, and a Junior/Senior High School (7-12) in Clarence. The district offices are located in Stanwood. The school district is accredited by the North Central Association of Colleges and Schools and the Iowa Department of Education.

History
It was established on July 1, 1995, by the merger of the Clarence-Lowden Community School District and the Lincoln Community School District.

Schools
 North Cedar Lowden Elementary Center, Lowden
 North Cedar Mechanicsville Elementary Center, Mechanicsville
 North Cedar Jr.-Sr. High School, Clarence

North Cedar High School

Athletics
North Cedar High School sports teams are known as the Knights; their uniforms display the school's colors of purple and teal.

The school fields athletic teams in 13 sports, including:

 Summer: Baseball and softball.
 Fall: Football, volleyball, and boys' and girls' cross country.
 Winter: Boys' basketball and wrestling.
 Girls' Basketball - 2000 State Champions 
 Spring: Boys' and girls' track and field; and boys' and girls' golf.

Outdoor sports, such as football and track and field, are played in Stanwood.  Baseball and Softball are played in Lowden. The indoor sports of volleyball, basketball and wrestling, take place at the Jr/Sr High School in Clarence.

North Cedar High School is classified as a 2A school (Iowa's second-smallest tier schools), according to the Iowa High School Athletic Association and Iowa Girls High School Athletic Union; in sports where there are fewer divisions, the Knights are in either the smallest or middle classes, depending on the sport (e.g., Class 2A for wrestling). The school is a member of the eight-team River Valley Conference, which comprises similar-sized schools from communities in eastern Iowa, spanning roughly the Iowa City area to the west, to Durant on the east. Prior to joining the RVC, North Cedar was a member of the Cedar Valley Conference, which consisted of Class 1A and 2A schools from east central Iowa.

North Cedar enjoys its biggest rivalries with neighboring school, Tipton, and also with the West Branch Bears.

Enrollment

See also
List of school districts in Iowa
List of high schools in Iowa

References

External links
school district web site information page

School districts in Iowa
Education in Cedar County, Iowa
Education in Jones County, Iowa
1995 establishments in Iowa
School districts established in 1995